The 1995 Montreal Expos season was the 27th season in franchise history. They finished the season with a record of 66-78, a last place finish and 24 games behind the World Series champion Atlanta Braves.

Offseason
March 29, 1995: Greg A. Harris was signed as a free agent with the Montreal Expos.

Spring training
The Expos held spring training at West Palm Beach Municipal Stadium in West Palm Beach, Florida – a facility they shared with the Atlanta Braves. It was their 19th season at the stadium; they had conducted spring training there from 1969 to 1972 and since 1981.

Regular season
June 3, 1995 – Pedro Martínez pitched 9 perfect innings against the San Diego Padres before giving up a hit in the 10th to notorious Expo-killer Bip Roberts over the head of Tony Tarasco in right field. He became the second pitcher in history, after Harvey Haddix, to have a perfect game broken up in extra innings.
June 11, 1995 – Rondell White had a career day in Candlestick Park against the San Francisco Giants. White picks up 6 hits and hits for the cycle. A crowd of 22,392 was on hand.

Season standings

Record vs. opponents

Opening Day starters
 Moisés Alou
 Shane Andrews
 Sean Berry
 Wil Cordero
 Jeff Fassero
 Roberto Kelly
 Tim Laker
 Mike Lansing
 Rondell White

Notable transactions
April 5, 1995: Ken Hill was traded by the Montreal Expos to the St. Louis Cardinals for Kirk Bullinger, Bryan Eversgerd, and Da Rond Stovall.
April 5, 1995: John Wetteland was traded by the Montreal Expos to the New York Yankees for Fernando Seguignol 
April 6, 1995: Marquis Grissom was traded by the Montreal Expos to the Atlanta Braves for Tony Tarasco, Esteban Yan, and Roberto Kelly.
May 23, 1995: Henry Rodriguez was traded by the Los Angeles Dodgers with Jeff Treadway to the Montreal Expos for Joey Eischen and Roberto Kelly.
June 1, 1995: Pete Laforest was drafted by the Montreal Expos in the 16th round of the 1995 amateur draft. Player signed June 5, 1995.
June 1, 1995: Future Super Bowl MVP Tom Brady was drafted by the Montreal Expos in the 18th round (507th pick) of the 1995 amateur draft. Brady was drafted out of Serra High School.
June 9, 1995: Rafael Bournigal was traded by the Los Angeles Dodgers to the Montreal Expos for Kris Foster.
July 16, 1995: Dave Silvestri was traded by the New York Yankees to the Montreal Expos for Tyrone Horne (minors).

Roster

Player stats

Batting

Starters by position 
Note: Pos = Position; G = Games played; AB = At bats; H = Hits; Avg. = Batting average; HR = Home runs; RBI = Runs batted in

Other batters 
Note: G = Games played; AB = At bats; H = Hits; Avg. = Batting average; HR = Home runs; RBI = Runs batted in

Pitching

Starting pitchers 
Note: G = Games pitched; IP = Innings pitched; W = Wins; L = Losses; ERA = Earned run average; SO = Strikeouts

Other pitchers 
Note: G = Games pitched; IP = Innings pitched; W = Wins; L = Losses; ERA = Earned run average; SO = Strikeouts

Relief pitchers 
Note: G = Games pitched; W = Wins; L = Losses; SV = Saves; ERA = Earned run average; SO = Strikeouts

Award winners

1995 Major League Baseball All-Star Game
 Carlos Pérez, pitcher, reserve

Farm system

LEAGUE CHAMPIONS: Ottawa

References

External links
 1995 Montreal Expos at Baseball Reference
 1995 Montreal Expos at Baseball Almanac
 

Montreal Expos seasons
Montreal Expos season
1990s in Montreal
1995 in Quebec